Ajay Devgn is an Indian actor, director and producer who works in Hindi films. He debuted as an actor in Phool Aur Kaante (1991), which won him the Filmfare Award for Best Male Debut. Devgn then played a kickboxer in the martial arts film Jigar (1992) and a blind in Vijaypath (1994). His subsequent hits include Suhaag (1994), Dilwale (1994), Naajayaz (1995), Diljale (1996), Jaan (1996), Ishq (1997), Pyaar To Hona Hi Tha (1998), and Hum Dil De Chuke Sanam (1999). He garnered Filmfare Best Actor nominations for Naajayaz and Hum Dil De Chuke Sanam. His performance in Zakhm (1998) secured Devgn his first National Film Award for Best Actor. In 2000, Devgn started Ajay Devgn FFilms and produced and headlined the commercially unsuccessful Raju Chacha. He got a Filmfare Best Supporting Actor nomination for enacting a dacoit in the ensemble film Lajja (2001).

2002 proved to be a banner year for Devgn as he received universal acclaim for his performances in Company, The Legend of Bhagat Singh and Deewangee. He won his second National Award for portraying revolutionary Bhagat Singh in The Legend of Bhagat Singh and received the Filmfare Critics Award for Best Actor for it and Company. As the antagonist of Deewangee, he earned a Filmfare Best Villain Award. His 2003 projects included Bhoot, a sleeper hit, and Gangaajal, in which he received another Filmfare Best Actor nomination for enacting a police officer. He next featured in Yuva (2004), Kaal (2005), and Omkara (2006). Rohit Shetty's Golmaal series established him in comic roles including Golmaal (2006), Golmaal Returns (2008) and Golmaal 3 (2010). Devgn was highly panned for Aag (2007), based on the 1975 cult classic Sholay. Aag is considered one of the worst films. In 2008, he directed and produced U Me Aur Hum. After featuring in Sunday (2008) and All the Best (2009), 2010 proved to be another milestone year for him as he delivered his first 100 Crore Club film with Golmaal 3 and received positive feedback for his roles in the top-grossing films Raajneeti and Once Upon a Time in Mumbaai. The latter fetched him a Filmfare Best Actor nomination, as like his next Singham (2011), the first part of Shetty's Cop Universe.

From the 2010s, Devgn shined to stardom with the successful comedies Bol Bachchan (2012), Son of Sardaar (2012), Golmaal Again (2017), Total Dhamaal (2019) and De De Pyaar De (2019) and the dramas Drishyam (2015) and Raid (2018). He reprised his role of Singham in Shetty's blockbuster films Singham Returns (2014), Simmba (2018) and Sooryavanshi (2021) and also directed, produced and starred in commercial failures like Shivaay (2016) and Runway 34 (2022). He produced and starred as the eponymous warrior in Tanhaji (2020), winning his third National Best Actor Award. In 2022, he secured further critical and commercial success with the films RRR, Gangubai Kathiawadi and Drishyam 2. Tanhaji, RRR, Drishyam 2 and Golmaal Again rank among the 200 Crore Club domestic net grossers.

Filmography

Films

Dubbing roles

Television

Music videos

See also 
 List of awards and nominations received by Ajay Devgn

Footnotes

References

Bibliography

External links 
 

Ajay Devgn
Indian filmographies
Male actor filmographies